In particle physics, neutral particle oscillation is the transmutation of a particle with zero electric charge into another neutral particle due to a change of a non-zero internal quantum number, via an interaction that does not conserve that quantum number. Neutral particle oscillations were first investigated in 1954 by Murray Gell-mann and Abraham Pais.

For example, a neutron cannot transmute into an antineutron as that would violate the conservation of baryon number. But in those hypothetical extensions of the Standard Model which include interactions that do not strictly conserve baryon number, neutron–antineutron oscillations are predicted to occur.

Such oscillations can be classified into two types:
 Particle–antiparticle oscillation (for example,    oscillation).
 Flavor oscillation (for example,  oscillation).

In those cases where the particles decay to some final product, then the system is not purely oscillatory, and an interference between oscillation and decay is observed.

History and motivation

CP violation 
After the striking evidence for parity violation provided by Wu et al. in 1957, it was assumed that CP (charge conjugation-parity) is the quantity which is conserved. However, in 1964 Cronin and Fitch reported CP violation in the neutral Kaon system. They observed the long-lived KL (with ) undergoing decays into two pions (with ) thereby violating CP conservation.

In 2001, CP violation in the  system was confirmed by the BaBar and the Belle experiments. Direct CP violation in the  system was reported by both the labs by 2005.

The  and the  systems can be studied as two state systems, considering the particle and its antiparticle as the two states.

The solar neutrino problem 
In 1968, R. Davis et al. first reported the results of the Homestake experiment. Also known as the Davis experiment, it used a huge tank of perchloroethylene in Homestake mine (it was deep underground to eliminate background from cosmic rays), South Dakota. Chlorine nuclei in the perchloroethylene absorb  to produce argon via the reaction

 ,

which is essentially

.

The experiment collected argon for several months. Because the neutrino interacts very weakly, only about one argon atom was collected every two days. The total accumulation was about one third of Bahcall's theoretical prediction.

In 1968, Bruno Pontecorvo showed that if neutrinos are not considered massless, then  (produced in the sun) can transform into some other neutrino species ( or ), to which Homestake detector was insensitive. This explained the deficit in the results of the Homestake experiment. The final confirmation of this solution to the solar neutrino problem was provided in April 2002 by the SNO (Sudbury Neutrino Observatory) collaboration, which measured both  flux and the total neutrino flux.

This 'oscillation' between the neutrino species can first be studied considering any two, and then generalized to the three known flavors.

Description as a two-state system

A special case: considering mixing only 

Caution: "mixing" discussed in this article is not the type obtained from mixed quantum states. Rather, "mixing" here refers to the superposition of "pure state" energy (mass) eigenstates, described by a "mixing matrix" (e.g. the CKM or PMNS matricies).

Let  be the state of the system at time  

If the system starts as an energy eigenstate of  i.e. say

 

then, the time evolved state, which is the solution of the Schrödinger equation

will be,

 

In other words, energy eigenstates are stationary eigenstates, i.e. they do not yield physically new states under time evolution.

In the basis   is diagonal. That is,

 

It can be shown, that oscillation between states will occur if and only if off-diagonal terms of the Hamiltonian are non-zero.

Hence let us introduce a general perturbation  in  such that the resultant Hamiltonian  is still Hermitian. Then,

  where  and 

and,

Since  is a general Hamiltonian matrix, it can be written as,

 

The following two results are clear:
 

{| class="wikitable collapsible collapsed"
! Proof
|-
| 
|}
 

{| class="wikitable collapsible collapsed"
! Proof
|-
| 

where the following results have been used:
 
  is a unit vector and hence 
|}

With the following parametrization (this parametrization helps as it normalizes the eigenvectors and also introduces an arbitrary phase  making the eigenvectors most general)

 ,

 

then under time evolution we get,

 

which unlike the previous case, is distinctly different from  

We can then obtain the probability of finding the system in state  at time  as,

which is called Rabi's formula.

From the expression of  we can infer that oscillation will exist only if   is thus known as the coupling term as it couples the two eigenstates of the unperturbed Hamiltonian  and thereby facilitates oscillation between the two.

Oscillation will also cease if the eigenvalues of the perturbed Hamiltonian  are degenerate, i.e.

Hence, the necessary conditions for oscillation are:
 Non-zero coupling, i.e. 
 Non-degenerate eigenvalues of the perturbed Hamiltonian , i.e.

The general case: considering mixing and decay 
If the particle(s) under consideration undergoes decay, then the Hamiltonian describing the system is no longer Hermitian. Since any matrix can be written as a sum of its Hermitian and anti-Hermitian parts,  can be written as,

 

The suffixes stand for Heavy and Light respectively (by convention) and this implies that  is positive.

Note that these eigenstates are no longer orthogonal.

Let the system start in the state . That is,

 

Under time evolution we then get,

 

Similarly, if the system starts in the state , under time evolution we obtain,

CP violation as a consequence 
If in a system  and  represent CP conjugate states (i.e. particle-antiparticle) of one another (i.e.  and ), and certain other conditions are met, then CP violation can be observed as a result of this phenomenon. Depending on the condition, CP violation can be classified into three types:

CP violation through decay only 
Consider the processes where  decay to final states , where the barred and the unbarred kets of each set are CP conjugates of one another.

 ,

and that of its CP conjugate process by,

 

If there is no CP violation due to mixing, then .

Now, the above two probabilities are unequal if,

.

Hence, the decay becomes a CP violating process as the probability of a decay and that of its CP conjugate process are not equal.

CP violation through mixing only 

 ,

and that of its CP conjugate process by,

 .

The above two probabilities are unequal if,

Hence, the particle-antiparticle oscillation becomes a CP violating process as the particle and its antiparticle (say,  and  respectively) are no longer equivalent eigenstates of CP.

CP violation through mixing-decay interference 
Let  be a final state (a CP eigenstate) that both  and  can decay to. Then, the decay probabilities are given by,

 

and,

From the above two quantities, it can be seen that even when there is no CP violation through mixing alone (i.e. ) and neither is there any CP violation through decay alone (i.e. ) and thus , the probabilities will still be unequal provided,

The last terms in the above expressions for probability are thus associated with interference between mixing and decay.

An alternative classification 
Usually, an alternative classification of CP violation is made:

Specific cases

Neutrino oscillation 

Considering a strong coupling between two flavor eigenstates of neutrinos (for example, –, –, etc.) and a very weak coupling between the third (that is, the third does not affect the interaction between the other two), equation gives the probability of a neutrino of type  transmuting into type  as,

 

The above can be written as,

Thus, a coupling between the energy (mass) eigenstates produces the phenomenon of oscillation between the flavor eigenstates. One important inference is that neutrinos have a finite mass, although very small. Hence, their speed is not exactly the same as that of light but slightly lower.

Neutrino mass splitting 
With three flavors of neutrinos, there are three mass splittings:

 

But only two of them are independent, because .

This implies that two of the three neutrinos have very closely placed masses. That is, any two out of the three can have closely spaced masses.

Moreover, since the oscillation is sensitive only to the differences (of the squares) of the masses, direct determination of neutrino mass is not possible from oscillation experiments.

Length scale of the system 
Equation indicates that an appropriate length scale of the system is the oscillation wavelength . We can draw the following inferences:
 If , then  and oscillation will not be observed. For example, production (say, by radioactive decay) and detection of neutrinos in a laboratory.
 If , where  is a whole number, then  and oscillation will not be observed.
 In all other cases, oscillation will be observed. For example,  for solar neutrinos;  for neutrinos from nuclear power plant detected in a laboratory few kilometers away.

Neutral kaon oscillation and decay

CP violation through mixing only 
The 1964 paper by Christenson et al. provided experimental evidence of CP violation in the neutral Kaon system. The so-called long-lived Kaon (CP = −1) decayed into two pions (CP = (−1)(−1) = 1), thereby violating CP conservation.

 and  being the strangeness eigenstates (with eigenvalues +1 and −1 respectively), the energy eigenstates are,

 

These two are also CP eigenstates with eigenvalues +1 and −1 respectively. From the earlier notion of CP conservation (symmetry), the following were expected:
 Because  has a CP eigenvalue of +1, it can decay to two pions or with a proper choice of angular momentum, to three pions. However, the two pion decay is a lot more frequent.
  having a CP eigenvalue −1, can decay only to three pions and never to two.

The 1964 experiment showed that contrary to what was expected,  could decay to two pions. That is,

 

where,  is a complex quantity and is a measure of departure from CP invariance. Experimentally, .

 

where, .

Since , condition is satisfied and there is a mixing between the strangeness eigenstates  and  giving rise to a long-lived and a short-lived state.

CP violation through decay only 
Both of these final states are CP eigenstates of themselves. We can define the branching ratios as,

 .

In other words, direct CP violation is observed in the asymmetry between the two modes of decay.

CP violation through mixing-decay interference 
If the final state (say ) is a CP eigenstate (for example ), then there are two different decay amplitudes corresponding to two different decay paths:

 .

CP violation can then result from the interference of these two contributions to the decay as one mode involves only decay and the other oscillation and decay.

Which then is the "real" particle? 
The above description refers to flavor (or strangeness) eigenstates and energy (or CP) eigenstates. But which of them represents the "real" particle? What do we really detect in a laboratory? Quoting David J. Griffiths:

The mixing matrix - a brief introduction 

If the system is a three state system (for example, three species of neutrinos , three species of quarks ), then, just like in the two state system, the flavor eigenstates (say ,) are written as a linear combination of the energy (mass) eigenstates (say ,). That is,

.

In case of leptons (neutrinos for example) the transformation matrix is the PMNS matrix, and for quarks it is the CKM matrix.

The off diagonal terms of the transformation matrix represent coupling, and unequal diagonal terms imply mixing between the three states.

The transformation matrix is unitary and appropriate parameterization (depending on whether it is the CKM or PMNS matrix) is done and the values of the parameters determined experimentally.

See also 
 CKM matrix
 CP violation
 CPT symmetry
 Kaon
 PMNS matrix
 Neutrino oscillation
 Rabi cycle

Footnotes

References 

Particle physics
Standard Model